Rod Lai Yee Lap (born 12 November 1961) is a Hong Kong fencer. He competed in the foil and épée events at the 1984 Summer Olympics. He was later a member of the examination board of the Hong Kong Fencing Association.

References

External links
 

1961 births
Living people
Hong Kong male foil fencers
Olympic fencers of Hong Kong
Fencers at the 1984 Summer Olympics
Hong Kong male épée fencers
20th-century Hong Kong people